Donald West (June 20, 1963 – December 30, 2022) was an American pitchman, television personality and professional wrestling broadcaster known for appearing on Total Nonstop Action Wrestling (TNA) as a commentator. West previously worked as a host for the Shop at Home Network. In the 1990s, West achieved a degree of fame for his loud, energetic, abrasive sales pitches on late night television and for his blunt tone and persuasive style.

Career

Don West initially became involved with television shopping when he applied for a job with the Shop at Home Network as the host of a sports memorabilia show, Sports Collectibles. Despite his degree in sports broadcasting (and the fact that his brother Dale was the chief financial officer of the Shop at Home Network), West was rejected on the basis of his "scrabbly voice". In 1991, West began selling knives on television, and in March 1993, he was finally given the job with the Shop at Home Network that he had applied for. Between 1993 and 2001, sales rose from $3 million to $150 million. In addition to sports memorabilia, West also pitched products such as Beanie Babies and Pokémon collectibles. Both Will Ferrell and Chris Kattan parodied West and his co-host, Eddy Lewis, on three episodes of Saturday Night Live.

In 2001, West amicably left the Shop at Home Network and began hosting a sports talk show called "The Sports Reporters" on WNSR in Nashville, Tennessee. The program covered sports topics of the day and ongoing local sports issues. West was contacted by Vince Russo, then booker for World Championship Wrestling, who invited him to join the company. West declined the offer as the company was bought out a year later.

In 2002, West was hired by Jeff Jarrett, who had been introduced to West by Russo, to serve as the color commentator for his newly formed professional wrestling promotion, Total Nonstop Action Wrestling. West made his commentary debut on June 19, 2002, on the inaugural TNA pay-per-view alongside Ed Ferrara and Mike Tenay. Ferrara departed TNA in August 2002, reducing the commentary team to Tenay and West. Aside from commentating, West accompanied Jeremy Borash on the YouTube-based show TNA Today, where he promoted new TNA merchandise and special packages called "Don West's Insane Daily Deals".

On the February 26, 2009, episode of Impact!, West turned heel when he verbally assaulted and walked out on his commentary partner Tenay, leaving him to call the remainder of the show alone. On the August 17, 2009, tapings of Impact! TNA removed West as a color commentator and replaced him with Taz. The company later announced that West had been promoted within the organization to oversee merchandise development and sales initiatives. On the October 15 edition of Impact! West returned as Amazing Red's new manager, turning face in the process, although this was shortlived. He then appeared mainly on TNA's internet programming and at house shows selling merchandise. In 2010, West became the pitchman for WildWestDeals.com, an internet marketing site.

On May 28, 2012, it was reported that West had given his notice and would be leaving TNA shortly, having accepted an offer to become the new director of sales and marketing of Wenatchee, Washington based Wenatchee Wild ice hockey team.

On January 13, 2017, Impact Wrestling, formerly known as TNA, revealed that West had joined the merchandise department. On July, 2, 2017, West returned to commentary for the final time at the Slammiversary XV pay-per-view. In 2022, Impact Wrestling featured a video tribute to their original announce team of West and Mike Tenay during Slammiversary.

Personal life and death
West was born in Chicago, Illinois. He attended Purdue University, where he majored in sports broadcasting. 

West was married to his wife Terri from July 18, 1992, until his death in 2022. On June 16, 2021, West announced that he had been diagnosed with a lymphoma of the brain, and began treatment. On December 30, 2022, Mike Tenay confirmed that West had died from lymphoma at the age of 59. Memorial tributes to West were made by the pro-wrestling community through social media and on WWE, AEW, and Impact Wrestling programming.

Awards and accomplishments
Wrestling Observer Newsletter
Worst Television Announcer (2007)

References

External links
Don West at wildwestdeals.com
TNA profile

Online World of Wrestling Profile
Wenatchee Wild Hockey - Front Office
 

1963 births
2022 deaths
American color commentators
American radio sports announcers
American television personalities 
Deaths from lymphoma
Sportspeople from Nashville, Tennessee
Sportspeople from Chicago
Professional wrestling announcers
Professional wrestling managers and valets
Purdue University alumni